The Odd Fellows Building at 133 N. Sierra St. in Reno, Nevada, United States was built in 1929.  It served as a clubhouse.  It was listed on the National Register of Historic Places.  However, it was demolished in 1992.

It was delisted from the National Register in 2000.

References

Reno
Buildings and structures in Reno, Nevada
Demolished buildings and structures in Nevada
Buildings and structures completed in 1929
Former National Register of Historic Places in Nevada
National Register of Historic Places in Reno, Nevada
Clubhouses on the National Register of Historic Places in Nevada
Buildings and structures demolished in 1992